The Oswayo Valley School District is a small, rural public school district serving portions of Potter County and McKean County. The school serves the boroughs of Oswayo and Shinglehouse, as well as Clara Township, Sharon Township, and Oswayo Township. A portion of McKean County's Ceres Township is also within district boundaries. According to 2000 federal census data, it served a resident population of 3,738. In 2010 the population had declined to 3,305. The educational attainment levels for the school district population (25 years old and over) were 87% high school graduates and 9% college graduates.

According to the Pennsylvania Budget and Policy Center, 54.9% of the district's pupils lived at 185% or below the Federal Poverty level as shown by their eligibility for the federal free or reduced price school meal programs in 2012. In 2009, the district residents' per capita income was $13,984, while the median family income was $37,340. In Potter County, the median household income was $39,196. In the Commonwealth, the median family income was $49,501 and the United States median family income was $49,445, in 2010.

Oswayo Valley School District operates an elementary school (PreK - 5), middle school (6-8) and high school (9-12). High school students may choose to attend Seneca Highlands Career and Technical Center for training in the construction and mechanical trades. The Seneca Highlands Intermediate Unit IU9 provides the district with a wide variety of services like specialized education for disabled students and hearing, speech and visual disability services and professional development for staff and faculty. The district is one of the 500 public school districts of Pennsylvania.

Extracurriculars
The district offers a wide variety of clubs, activities and sports.

Sports
The district funds:

Boys
Baseball - A
Basketball- A
Cross country - AA
Golf - AA
Track and field - AA
Wrestling  - AA

Girls
Basketball - A
Cross country - A
Golf - AA
Softball - A
Track and field - AA
Volleyball

Middle school sports

Boys
Basketball
Cross country
Track and field
Wrestling 

Girls
Basketball
Cross country
Track and field
Volleyball 

According to PIAA directory July 2012

References

External links
 
 Seneca Highlands Intermediate Unit 9
 Pennsylvania Interscholastic Athletic Association (PIAA)

School districts in McKean County, Pennsylvania
School districts in Potter County, Pennsylvania
Educational institutions with year of establishment missing